L. arborea may refer to:
 Lavatera arborea, the tree mallow, a flowering plant species native to the coasts of western Europe and the Mediterranean region, from the British Isles south to Algeria and Libya and east to Greece
 Lullula arborea, the woodlark, a bird species that breeds across most of Europe, the Middle East Asia and the mountains of north Africa

See also 
 Arborea (disambiguation)